Lock n' Load with R. Lee Ermey is a reality television series about the development of military weaponry throughout the centuries.  Hosted by actor and former U.S. Marine drill instructor R. Lee Ermey, its one season originally aired on the History channel in 2009.

Format
In a typical episode, Ermey focused on one specific type of weapon or weapon system, presenting key advancements in its technology and demonstrating their use with the help of experts. In a holdover from his duties hosting Mail Call on the History Channel, he frequently added humor in the form of light-hearted drill instructor haranguing aimed at the viewer. He also displayed an eagerness to try out the episode's relevant weapons against a wide range of targets, particularly watermelons ("they taste better after being shot with a machine gun"), as well as glass bottles.

The series was produced by Simon J. Heath, who also developed the concept.

Episodes

The pilot episode first aired in December 2008. This rated well and was followed by a series in 2009. The show premiered on July 26, 2009 and only ran for one season and ended up getting cancelled in November 2009.

"Artillery"
"Machine Guns"
"Tanks"
"Pistols"
"Helicopters" (filmed at Yakima Firing Center in Yakima, Washington)
"Armored Vehicles"
"Shotguns"
"Rockets"
"Blades"
"Ammo"
"Rifles"
"MG2" (Machine Guns, part 2)
"Bunker Busters" (military demolition)

References

External links
Lock N' Load with R. Lee Ermey on the History Channel

American military television series
Television shows about weaponry
English-language television shows
2008 American television series debuts
2009 American television series debuts
2000s American reality television series
2009 American television series endings
History (American TV channel) original programming
Television shows about the United States Marine Corps